Arenigs is an informal term for a group of mountains in central Snowdonia, in north Wales. They are not strictly defined, but normally include at least the following peaks:

Mountains and hills of Snowdonia
Mountains and hills of Gwynedd
Mountains and hills of Conwy County Borough